Robertus cantabricus is a spider in the family Theridiidae. The scientific name of this species was first published in 1931 by Jean-Louis Fage.

References

Theridiidae
Spiders of Europe
Spiders described in 1931